The details of the 2007 All-Japan University Rugby Football Championships (全国大学ラグビーフットボール選手権大会 - Zenkoku Daigaku Ragubi- Futtobo-ru Senshuken Taikai)

Qualifying Teams 

 Top League Microsoft Cup Finalists - Suntory Sungoliath, Toshiba Brave Lupus
 Top League Third and Fourth - Yamaha Jubilo, Toyota Verblitz
 All Japan University Rugby Championship - Kanto Gakuin University, Waseda University
 Japan Rugby Club Champion - Tamariba Club
 Top Challenger Series - Kyuden Voltex

Knockout stages

First round

Quarter-finals

Semi-finals

Final

See also 
 Rugby union in Japan

All-Japan Rugby Football Championship
2006–07 in Japanese rugby union
Japan